Immortal Beloved is a 1994 biographical film written and directed by Bernard Rose and starring Gary Oldman, Jeroen Krabbé, Isabella Rossellini and Johanna ter Steege. The film narrates the life of composer Ludwig van Beethoven (played by Oldman) in flashbacks while it follows Beethoven's secretary and first biographer Anton Schindler's (Krabbé) quest to ascertain the true identity of the Unsterbliche Geliebte (Immortal Beloved) addressed in three letters found in the late composer's private papers. Schindler journeys throughout the Austrian Empire interviewing women who might be potential candidates, as well as through Beethoven's own tumultuous life.

Plot
When Ludwig van Beethoven dies, his assistant and close friend Schindler deals with his last will and testament. It reads that his estate, music and affairs will be left to his "immortal beloved," but there remains a question as to who is Beethoven's "immortal beloved," an unnamed woman mentioned in one of his letters. Schindler embarks on a quest to find out and meets the women who he knew had played a part in Ludwig's life.

Schindler first meets with Giulietta Giucciardi, who became a piano student of Beethoven's when she was a wealthy, young unmarried woman and fell in love with him. Despite Giulietta's father disapproving, she intends to marry Beethoven. She attempts to prove to her father that, despite rumors to the contrary, Beethoven can still play music himself, and hides with him while the composer plays the piano forte, believing he is alone. When he discovers Giulietta and her father, he is furious, feeling betrayed. He cuts ties with her and storms out. She calls after him to apologize, and only then realizes that Beethoven is deaf.

Schindler next meets Anna-Marie Erdödy, who took Beethoven in after becoming outraged with the audience mocking him at a poor performance, as the composer, now completely deaf, had become unable to properly conduct the orchestra. Anna-Marie's young son is killed during Napoleon's attack on Vienna and Beethoven comforts her in her grief, leading to a love affair, but she denies being his "immortal beloved."

Schindler's investigation brings him back to Beethoven's own family, recounting his disapproval of his brother marrying Johanna Reiss, the daughter of Anton Van Reiss, a prosperous Viennese upholsterer, even attempting to have her arrested at one point. After his brother's death, Beethoven is able to seize custody of his nephew Karl. Even though the boy is indifferent to music, his uncle becomes obsessed with making him a composer, neglecting his own career, which suffers.

Karl grows into a teenager, having spent hours daily practicing the piano. Beethoven is convinced that Karl will be a great success as a composer, but Karl knows he has no talent and, pushed to his breaking point by his uncle, attempts suicide. He survives but tells Beethoven he never wants to see him again.

Schindler discovers that Beethoven's great love was Johanna, and that Karl, conceived before her marriage, is actually his son, not his nephew. They had intended to elope, but Beethoven was delayed and wrote the "immortal beloved" letter to Johanna to let her know. However, Johanna never received it and, believing Beethoven had abandoned her, left and married his brother instead. Both feeling betrayed, their love grew to hate. Johanna tells Schindler that when she saw the performance of his ninth symphony, she was moved to forgive him and ultimately made peace with him on his deathbed, where he gave her a signed letter, giving her custody over Karl.

Schindler gives Johanna the letter to the "Immortal Beloved" in which she finally reads what happened that night they were supposed to meet. Shocked to find out how an unfortunate event and misunderstanding has kept them apart, she visits Beethoven's grave.

Cast 
 Gary Oldman as Ludwig van Beethoven 
 Jeroen Krabbé as Anton Felix Schindler 
 Isabella Rossellini as Anna-Marie Erdödy 
 Johanna ter Steege as Johanna Reiss
 Christopher Fulford as Kaspar van Beethoven 
 Michael Culkin as Jakob Hotscevar
 Marco Hofschneider as Karl van Beethoven
 Miriam Margolyes as Nanette Streicherova 
 Barry Humphries as Clemens Metternich 
 Valeria Golino as Giulietta Guicciardi
 Alexandra Pigg as Therese Obermayer
 Geno Lechner as Josephine von Brunsvik
 Claudia Solti as Theresa von Brunsvik

Historical background

After Beethoven's death in 1827, a three-part letter was found among his private papers addressed to a woman whom he called "immortal beloved". Written in the summer of 1812 from the spa town of Teplice, the letter has generated a great deal of speculation and debate among scholars and writers as to her identity. Among the candidates, then and now, are Giulietta Guicciardi, Thérèse von Brunsvik, Josephine Brunsvik, Antonie Brentano, and Anna-Marie Erdödy, some of whom are portrayed in the film.

The film's writer and director, Bernard Rose, though not a historian, claimed that he had successfully identified the addressed woman as Beethoven's sister-in-law Johanna (Reiss) van Beethoven, a claim no scholar on Beethoven has endorsed. The film also implies that Karl, Beethoven's nephew, was in reality the couple's son. Biographer Gail S. Altman disputed Rose's claim in a book devoted specifically to the question of the woman's identity and Beethoven's relationships in general.

Music
 The Orchestra: London Symphony Orchestra, conducted by Georg Solti
 Instrumental soloists
 Murray Perahia, piano
 Gidon Kremer, violin
 Juilliard String Quartet
(in order of appearance)
 Symphony No 5, Op. 67. Allegro con brio
 Missa Solemnis: Kyrie.
 Für Elise (complete).
 Symphony No 3 In E-Flat Major Op.55 Eroica.
 Piano Sonata No 14, Moonlight: Adagio Sostenuto.
 Symphony No 6, Op. 68, Pastoral: Storm.
 Piano Trio No 5 In D Major, Op. 70, No 1 Ghost.
 Violin Concerto in D Major, Op. 61.
 Piano Sonata No 8, Pathetique.
 The Thieving Magpie, by Rossini (doesn't appear on the CD)
 Symphony No 9, Op 125: Allegro ma non troppo, un poco maestoso (first 2 minutes, doesn't appear on the CD)
 Piano Concerto No 5, Emperor (love theme, ending credits).
 Symphony No 7, Op. 92: Allegretto (Karl's theme)
 Violin Sonata In A Major, Op. 47, Kreutzer: Adagio sostenuto- Presto.
 Symphony No 9, Op 125: Ode to Joy.
 String Quartet No 13 in B-Flat Major, Op. 130
 Christus am Ölberg, Oratorio, Op. 85

Reception

Critical response
Reviews for Immortal Beloved were mixed. On Rotten Tomatoes the film has an approval rating of 57% based on 56 reviews, with an average rating of 6.2/10. The site's consensus states: "A contrived romantic mystery and ponderous pacing make Immortal Beloved a not-so-joyful ode to Ludwig van Beethoven, despite Gary Oldman's best efforts to inject some passion into proceedings."  Audiences surveyed by CinemaScore gave the film a grade A− on scale of A to F.

Emanuel Levy gave the film a "C" rating, calling it a "speculative chronicle" that lacks the "vibrant energy and charm" of Wolfgang Amadeus Mozart biopic Amadeus (1984). He praised the "wonderfully recorded and inventively used" Beethoven compositions as well as the casting of Oldman, who he felt was "the perfect actor to portray the arrogant, irascible musician". Roger Ebert was highly complimentary of the film. He gave it 3½ stars out of four, stating in his review: "Immortal Beloved has clearly been made by people who feel Beethoven directly in their hearts". He asserted that Oldman "at first seems an unlikely choice...then we see that he is right". Janet Maslin also offered a positive review, stating: "thanks to its hugely effective use of Beethoven's most thrilling, tumultuous music, this film exerts much the same hypnotic power". She praised the performance of Oldman, writing that "he captures Beethoven as a believably brilliant figure struggling with his deafness and other demons".

MSN Movies, in a 2011 publication, wrote: "Oldman's performance is unimpeachable. He dives deep into the role with powerful passion and makes the audience feel the pain of the genius as he loses his hearing and fails to shape his nephew into a similarly talented musician. In the year of '[Forrest] Gump', Oldman was overlooked for a well-deserved Oscar nomination." Also that year Josh Winning of Total Film named Oldman's portrayal of Beethoven as one of the five best performances of his career, saying: "Immersing himself fully into the role of the German composer, Oldman is here damn near unrecognisable. The fact that he remains silent for the first 20 minutes of the film while simultaneously emoting for England is a small triumph in itself."

Box office
The movie debuted strongly and was a modest success, generating $9,914,409 in a domestic-only release.

Year-end lists 
 5th – Steve Persall, St. Petersburg Times
 Top 10 (not ranked) – George Meyer, The Ledger

See also

 List of films featuring the deaf and hard of hearing

References

External links 

 
 
 

1994 films
1990s biographical drama films
British biographical drama films
American biographical drama films
Musical films based on actual events
Biographical films about pianists
Depictions of Ludwig van Beethoven on film
Cultural depictions of Klemens von Metternich
Films directed by Bernard Rose (director)
Films produced by Bruce Davey
Columbia Pictures films
Icon Productions films
Films set in the 19th century
Films set in Austria
Films set in Germany
Films shot in the Czech Republic
Films with screenplays by Bernard Rose (director)
1994 drama films
Films set in the Austrian Empire
1990s American films
1990s British films
Films about disability